Yanjisuchus is an extinct genus of paralligatorid neosuchian known from the Early Cretaceous Longjing Formation of Guizhou, China. It contains a single species, Y. longshanensis.

References 

Early Cretaceous crocodylomorphs of Asia
Fossil taxa described in 2021